The enzyme (+)-δ-cadinene synthase (EC 4.2.3.13) catalyzes the chemical reaction

(2E,6E)-farnesyl diphosphate  (+)-δ-cadinene + diphosphate

This enzyme belongs to the family of lyases, specifically those carbon-oxygen lyases acting on phosphates.  The systematic name of this enzyme class is (2E,6E)-farnesyl-diphosphate diphosphate-lyase (cyclizing, (+)-δ-cadinene-forming). This enzyme participates in terpenoid biosynthesis.  It employs one cofactor, magnesium.

δ-Cadinene synthase, a sesquiterpene cyclase, is an enzyme expressed in plants that catalyzes a cyclization reaction in terpenoid biosynthesis. The enzyme cyclizes farnesyl diphosphate to δ-cadinene and releases pyrophosphate.

δ-Cadinene synthase is one of the key steps in the synthesis of gossypol, a toxic terpenoid produced in cotton seeds. Recently, cotton plants that stably underexpress the enzyme in seeds have been developed using RNA interference techniques, producing a plant that had been proposed as a rich source of dietary protein for developing countries.

External links
 BRENDA entry
 SwissProt entry

References

 
 
 

EC 4.2.3
Magnesium enzymes
Enzymes of unknown structure